Takamoto is a Japanese surname and given name.

Notable people with the surname include:

 Iwao Takamoto (1925–2007), Japanese-American animator
 Megumi Takamoto (born 1985), Japanese voice actress and singer
 Norifumi Takamoto (born 1967), Japanese footballer

Notable people with the given name include:
 Moniwa Takamoto (1854–1919), Japanese samurai
 Mōri Takamoto (1523–1563), Japanese feudal lord

See also
Takemoto, also a Japanese surname

Japanese-language surnames